Sofiane Hamdi (born 22 August 1989) is a Paralympic athlete from Algeria competing mainly in category T37 sprint events.

He competed in the 2008 Summer Paralympics in Beijing, China.  There he won a silver medal in the men's 200 metres – T37 event and a bronze medal in the men's 100 metres – T37 event

References

External links 
 

1989 births
Living people
Algerian male sprinters
Algerian disabled sportspeople
Paralympic athletes of Algeria
Paralympic silver medalists for Algeria
Paralympic bronze medalists for Algeria
Athletes (track and field) at the 2008 Summer Paralympics
Athletes (track and field) at the 2012 Summer Paralympics
African Games gold medalists for Algeria
African Games silver medalists for Algeria
African Games medalists in athletics (track and field)
Athletes (track and field) at the 2011 All-Africa Games
Athletes (track and field) at the 2015 African Games
Medalists at the 2008 Summer Paralympics
Paralympic medalists in athletics (track and field)
Athletes (track and field) at the 2020 Summer Paralympics
21st-century Algerian people